Early presidential elections were held in the Nagorno-Karabakh Republic on 1 September 1997 after President Robert Kocharyan was appointed Prime Minister of Armenia. The result was a victory for independent candidate Arkadi Ghukasyan, who received 89% of the vote.

Results

References

Nagorno
Nagorno
1997 in the Nagorno-Karabakh Republic
Presidential elections in the Republic of Artsakh